Menlo Park station is a Caltrain station located in Menlo Park, California. The station was originally built in 1867 by the San Francisco and San Jose Railroad and acquired by the Southern Pacific Railroad. During the 1890s, Southern Pacific added Victorian ornamentation to the depot to make it appear more attractive to students and visitors to Stanford University. The station was added to the National Register of Historic Places in 1974, and became a California Historical Landmark in 1983.

References

External links

Caltrain stations in San Mateo County, California
Railway stations on the National Register of Historic Places in California
Railway stations in the United States opened in 1867
Former Southern Pacific Railroad stations in California
Menlo Park, California
National Register of Historic Places in San Mateo County, California